The 1964 Omloop Het Volk was the 19th edition of the Omloop Het Volk cycle race and was held on 29 February 1964. The race started and finished in Ghent. The race was won by Frans Melckenbeeck.

General classification

References

1964
Omloop Het Nieuwsblad
Omloop Het Nieuwsblad